Pavlo Mykolaiyovych Burlakov is a Ukrainian politician and miner. In 2010–14 he served as the First Vice Prime Minister of Crimea and ex oficio served as Prime Minister of Crimea upon the abrupt death of Vasyl Dzharty.

References

External links

1963 births
Living people
Politicians from Donetsk
Donetsk National Technical University alumni
Komsomol of Ukraine members
Liberal Party of Ukraine politicians
Party of Regions politicians
Prime Ministers of Crimea
Fifth convocation members of the Verkhovna Rada
Sixth convocation members of the Verkhovna Rada
Recipients of the Order of Merit (Ukraine), 3rd class
Laureates of the Honorary Diploma of the Verkhovna Rada of Ukraine